Annette Hoyt Flanders was an American landscape architect. Her work on residential gardens was primarily in the Eastern and Midwestern United States. She was recognized in House & Garden's Hall of Fame in 1930 and elected a Fellow of the American Society of Landscape Architects in 1942.

Early life and education 
Annette Hoyt was born in 1887 in Milwaukee, Wisconsin, to parents Frank M. Hoyt, a prominent attorney, and Hettie Pamelia Hoyt. Her early education consisted of tutors and private schools until she attended Smith College, where she earned her B.A. in botany in 1914. She then attended the University of Illinois for her B.S. in landscape architecture, graduating in 1918. Hoyt also studied civil engineering and architecture at Marquette University. Hoyt married lawyer Roger Yale Flanders in 1913, becoming Annette Hoyt Flanders.

Career 
From 1918 to 1919, after graduating from university, Flanders served with the American Red Cross in France. When she returned to the U.S. she joined Vitale, Brinckerhoff, and Geiffert, a landscape architecture firm in New York, and was responsible for design and planting supervision.

In 1922, Flanders opened her own office in New York. Her projects included private estates, real estate subdivisions, industrial plants, recreational developments, and exhibit gardens around the United States. She employed landscape architects Helen Swift Jones and Helen Elise Bullard. In 1942, she closed this New York office and reopened her office in her hometown of Milwaukee in 1943. Flanders’ most notable projects included the Phipps Estate, the Morven Farm Gardens, and the McCann Estate French Gardens. In 1932, the McCann Estate French Gardens won Flanders the Architectural League of New York's Medal of Honor in Landscape Architecture.

In her work, Flanders emphasized minimizing the amount of grading required for a design. She argued instead that landscape designs should adhere to the natural form of the land. She drew inspiration from several different styles, including the Beaux Arts, Midwestern naturalism, and Modernism.

Flanders lectured extensively to horticultural and botanical societies, women's clubs, and schools. She wrote for several publications, including House & Garden, Country Life in America, and House Beautiful, promoting simple, livable, and economical garden design. Flanders was also the consultant garden editor for the Good Housekeeping magazine from 1933 to 1934, and published a series on suburban garden design. 

In 1930, Flanders was recognized in House and Garden's Hall of Fame, and in 1942 she was elected as a Fellow of the American Society of Landscape Architects.

Flanders died on June 7, 1946.

Major works 

 Estate gardens for Sigmund Lehmann and his sons, Tarrytown NY
 Phipps Estate, Denver CO
 Morven Farm Gardens, Charlottesville VA
 McCann Estate French Gardens, Oyster Bay NY

References 

Women landscape architects
Landscape architects
American landscape architects
American landscape and garden designers